{{DISPLAYTITLE:C18H26O5}}
The molecular formula C18H26O5 may refer to:

 Taleranol (β-zearalanol), a synthetic, nonsteroidal estrogen which was never marketed
 Zeranol (α-zearalanol), a synthetic nonsteroidal estrogen used mainly as an anabolic agent in veterinary medicine